Estonia competed at the 2020 Winter Youth Olympics in Lausanne, Switzerland from 9 to 22 January 2020.

Medalists
Medals awarded to participants of mixed-NOC teams are represented in italics. These medals are not counted towards the individual NOC medal tally.

Competitors
The following is the list of number of competitors that participated at the Games per sport/discipline.

* Markkus Alter and Triinu Hausenberg competed in nordic combined and ski jumping

Alpine skiing

Boys

Biathlon

Boys

Girls

Mixed

Cross-country skiing

Boys

Girls

Curling

Estonia qualified a mixed team of four athletes.
Mixed team

Mixed doubles

Figure skating

Two Estonian figure skaters achieved quota places for Estonia based on their results in the ISU Junior Grand Prix.

Singles

Mixed NOC team trophy

Freestyle skiing

Girls

Ice hockey

3x3

Nordic combined

Boys

Girls

Ski jumping

Boys

Girls

See also
Estonia at the 2020 Summer Olympics

References

2020 in Estonian sport
Nations at the 2020 Winter Youth Olympics
Estonia at the Youth Olympics